Hörden am Harz is a municipality in the district of Göttingen, in Lower Saxony, Germany.

References